In knot theory, an area of mathematics, the link group of a link is an analog of the knot group of a knot. They were described by John Milnor in his Ph.D. thesis, . Notably, the link group is not in general the fundamental group of the link complement.

Definition 

The link group of an n-component link is essentially the set of (n + 1)-component links extending this link, up to link homotopy.  In other words, each component of the extended link is allowed to move through regular homotopy (homotopy through immersions), knotting or unknotting itself, but is not allowed to move through other components. This is a weaker condition than isotopy: for example, the Whitehead link has linking number 0, and thus is link homotopic to the unlink, but it is not isotopic to the unlink.

The link group is not the fundamental group of the link complement, since the components of the link are allowed to move through themselves, though not each other, but thus is a quotient group of the link complement's fundamental group, since one can start with elements of the fundamental group, and then by knotting or unknotting components, some of these elements may become equivalent to each other.

Examples 
The link group of the n-component unlink is the free group on n generators, as the link group of a single link is the knot group of the unknot, which is the integers, and the link group of an unlinked union is the free product of the link groups of the components.

The link group of the Hopf link, the simplest non-trivial link – two circles, linked once – is the free abelian group on two generators,  Note that the link group of two unlinked circles is the free nonabelian group on two generators, of which the free abelian group on two generators is a quotient. In this case the link group is the fundamental group of the link complement, as the link complement deformation retracts onto a torus.

The Whitehead link is link homotopic to the unlink – though it is not isotopic to the unlink – and thus has link group the free group on two generators.

Milnor invariants
For each k, there is an k-ary function  which defines invariants according to which k of the links one selects, in which order.

As with Massey products, the Milnor invariants of length k + 1 are defined if all Milnor invariants of length less than or equal to k vanish. The first (2-fold) Milnor invariant is simply the linking number (just as the 2-fold Massey product is the cup product, which is dual to intersection), while the 3-fold Milnor invariant measures whether 3 pairwise unlinked circles are Borromean rings, and if so, in some sense, how many times (that is to say, the Borromean rings have a Milnor 3-fold invariant of 1 or –1, depending on order, but other 3-element links can have an invariant of 2 or more, just as linking numbers can be greater than 1).

Another definition is the following: consider a link . Pick any Seifert surfaces for the respective link components, say, such that  for all . Then the Milnor 3-fold invariant equals minus the number of intersection points in  counting with signs; .

Milnor invariants can also be defined if the lower order invariants do not vanish, but then there is an indeterminacy, which depends on the values of the lower order invariants. This indeterminacy can be understood geometrically as the indeterminacy in expressing a link as a closed string link, as discussed below (it can also be seen algebraically as the indeterminacy of Massey products if lower order Massey products do not vanish).  

Viewed from this point of view, Milnor invariants are finite type invariants, and in fact they (and their products) are the only rational finite type concordance invariants of string links; .

, 
where  is the Möbius function; see for instance .

Applications 
Link groups can be used to classify Brunnian links.

See also 
 Knot group
 Regular homotopy

References 
 
 
 

 
 
 
 

Knot invariants
Links (knot theory)